The abcoulomb (abC or aC) or electromagnetic unit of charge (emu of charge) is the derived physical unit of electric charge in the cgs-emu system of units.  One abcoulomb is equal to ten coulombs.

The name "abcoulomb" was introduced by Kennelly in 1903 as a short form of (absolute) electromagnetic cgs unit of charge that was in use since the adoption of the cgs system in 1875.  The abcoulomb was coherent with the cgs-emu system, in contrast to the coulomb, the practical unit of charge that had been adopted too in 1875.

CGS-emu (or "electromagnetic cgs") units are one of several systems of electromagnetic units within the centimetre gram second system of units; others include CGS-esu, Gaussian units, and Heaviside–Lorentz units.  In these other systems, the abcoulomb is not used; CGS-esu and Gaussian units use the statcoulomb instead, while the Heaviside–Lorentz unit of charge has no specific name.

In the electromagnetic cgs system, electric current is a fundamental quantity defined via Ampère's law and takes the permeability as a dimensionless quantity (relative permeability) whose value in a vacuum is unity.  As a consequence, the square of the speed of light appears explicitly in some of the equations interrelating quantities in this system.

The definition of the abcoulomb follows from that of the abampere: given two parallel currents of one abampere separated by one centimetre, the force per distance of wire is 2 dyn/cm.  The abcoulomb is the charge flowing in 1 second given a current of 1 abampere.

References

Units of electrical charge
Centimetre–gram–second system of units